The 2003 Lehigh Mountain Hawks football team was an American football team that represented Lehigh University during the 2003 NCAA Division I-AA football season. Lehigh finished second in the Patriot League.

In their third year under head coach Pete Lembo, the Mountain Hawks compiled an 8–3 record. Mike Gregorek, Tom McGeoy, Jermaine Pugh and Michael Taggart were the team captains.

The Mountain Hawks outscored opponents 327 to 185. Their 6–1 conference record placed second in the eight-team Patriot League. 

The Mountain Hawks were unranked in the preseason Division I-AA national poll. Two separate win streaks of three games each earned them spots in the top 25, but Lehigh only spent a total of four weeks in the poll. At the end of the year, Lehigh was ranked No. 23 in the final poll. 

Lehigh played its home games at Goodman Stadium on the university's Goodman Campus in Bethlehem, Pennsylvania.

Schedule

References

Lehigh
Lehigh Mountain Hawks football seasons
Lehigh Mountain Hawks football